The Bowling Green OMS #10, at 719 Old Morgantown Rd. in Bowling Green, Kentucky, was built in 1947.  It was listed on the National Register of Historic Places in 2002.

It is a Modern Movement style "Organizational Maintenance Shed" built to provide for maintenance and storage of Kentucky National Guard vehicles.

It is built of concrete blocks and was painted white.

See also 
 Ravenna Motor Vehicle Service Building

References

Government buildings completed in 1947
1947 establishments in Kentucky
Kentucky National Guard
National Register of Historic Places in Bowling Green, Kentucky
Motor vehicle maintenance
Modern Movement architecture in the United States
Modernist architecture in Kentucky